Springside may refer to:

Australia 
 Springside, Queensland, a locality in the Toowoomba Region

Canada 
 Springside, Saskatchewan, a town

United Kingdom 
Springside, North Ayrshire, a village in Scotland

United States 
Springside (Poughkeepsie, New York), estate of Matthew Vassar with landscaped grounds in Poughkeepsie, New York, U.S.A.
Springside School, a private all-girls school in Philadelphia, Pennsylvania, U.S.A.